Demi-glace ('half glaze') is a rich brown sauce in French cuisine used by itself or as a base for other sauces.  The term comes from the French word glace, which, when used in reference to a sauce, means "icing" or "glaze."  It is traditionally made by combining one part espagnole sauce and one part brown stock. The sauce is then reduced by half, strained of any leftover impurities, and finished with a sherry wine.

Common variants of demi-glace use a 1:1 mixture of beef or chicken stock to sauce espagnole; these are referred to as "beef demi-glace" (demi-glace au bœuf) or "chicken demi-glace" (demi-glace au poulet).  The term "demi-glace" by itself implies that it is made with the traditional veal stock.

Preparation 

The basic recipe for demi-glace is provided by the French chef Auguste Escoffier, who is often considered to have refined the method of French cooking, as well as codified many standard French recipes. Although many recipes for demi-glace give the preparation for the espagnole first, followed by the recipe for the brown stock, preparation should actually proceed in the reverse since the brown stock is itself a necessary ingredient of the sauce espagnole.

A basic brown stock should be prepared, and when completed, left on the heat to remain very warm. At this point, the espagnole can be prepared using half the brown stock, and when it is finished, the remaining brown stock is added in equal portions to the espagnole. Demi-glace keeps very well, about six months refrigerated or almost indefinitely frozen.

Due to the considerable effort involved in making the traditional demi-glace, chefs commonly substitute a simple jus lié of veal stock or to create a simulated version, which the American cookbook author Julia Child referred to as a "semi-demi-glace" (i.e. sans espagnole sauce). However, even today, many chefs who prepare French haute cuisine use a demi-glace prepared in their own kitchen. Concentrates and mixes, mostly available to professional kitchens, are another way of avoiding the labor involved in preparing the sauce.

See also

 Gypsy sauce
 List of sauces
 Meat glaze

References

Further reading
  For Auguste Escoffier's half glaze recipe.

External links
Emeril Lagasse's recipe for demi-glace on foodnetwork.com—largely follows Escoffier's original recipe

Brown sauces
Steak sauces

de:Kraftsauce